The Cathedral Caves are two connected limestone sea caves located on Waipati Beach,  south of Papatowai, on the Catlins Coast in the southeast corner of the South Island, New Zealand. Often blue penguins and fur seals will emerge from the gloom at the far end of the cave.

The 199m-long cave is formed in Jurassic sandstone (about 160 million years old) of the Murihiku Terrane, though the cave itself is much younger, ten to hundreds of thousands of years old. They were named by Thomas Hocken who noted how the caves reverberated noise and their resemblance to European cathedrals. The caves are only accessible for an hour either side of low tide. They are managed by Kāi Tahu descendants

Further reading 

 "The late Quaternary sediments and fossils vertebrate fauna from Cathedral Cave, Wellington Cave, New South Wales," Dawson, Lyndall and Augee, M.L., 1997, Proceedings of the Linnean Society of New South Wales

References

External links

Official website - Information about the caves, including tide charts and pictures

Rock formations of Otago
Coastline of New Zealand
Caves of New Zealand
Southern Scenic Route
Sea caves
The Catlins
Tourist attractions in Otago
Clutha District